The Sacramento pikeminnow (''Ptychocheilus grandis'), formerly known as the Sacramento squawfish, is a large cyprinid fish of California, United States. It is native to the Los Angeles River, Sacramento-San Joaquin, Pajaro-Salinas, Russian River, Clear Lake and upper Pit River river basins.

The species has been introduced into the Salt River, where it is considered an invasive species.

The species was introduced to the Eel River watershed in the 1970s by anglers using the pikeminnow as bait. Until then, it eats anything in its path. Because it is invasive in the Eel River, it has very few predators. River otter populations have increased and helped stabilize the pikeminnow population, but they still put pressure on endangered salmonid species.

References

External links
 "Sacramento pikeminnow" on the California Fish Website . accessed October 5, 2010.

Ptychocheilus
Endemic fauna of California
Fish of the Western United States
Freshwater fish of the United States
Natural history of the Central Valley (California)
Los Angeles River
Sacramento River
Salinas River (California)
San Joaquin River
Fish described in 1854